Jake Tonges (born July 8, 1999) is an American football tight end for the Chicago Bears of the National Football League (NFL). He played college football at California.

College career
Tonges was a member of the California Golden Bears for five seasons, redshirting his true freshman year. As a redshirt senior, he caught 22 passes for 278 yards and two touchdowns. Tonges finished his collegiate career with 47 receptions for 620 yards and four touchdowns.

Professional career
Tonges signed with the Chicago Bears as an undrafted free agent on April 30, 2022. He made the Bears' initial 53-man roster out of training camp. He was waived on November 10, 2022, and re-signed to the practice squad. He signed a reserve/future contract on January 9, 2023.

References

External links
California Golden Bears bio
Chicago Bears bio

1999 births
Living people
Players of American football from California
American football tight ends
California Golden Bears football players
Chicago Bears players